{{Speciesbox
| fossil_range = 
| image = Pair of Emydura macquarii - Warrawong.JPG
| image_caption = Macquarie turtleEmydura macquarii
| status = LC
| status_system = IUCN2.3
| genus = Emydura
| species = macquarii
| authority = (Gray, 1830)<ref name=gray1830>Gray JE (1830). "A synopsis of the species of the class Reptilia". pp. 1-110. In: Griffith E (1830). The Animal Kingdom arranged in Conformity with its Organisation by the Baron Cuvier. London: Whitaker and Treacher and Co. 9:481 + 110pp.</ref>
| subdivision_ranks = Subspecies
| subdivision = 
E. m. macquarrii  
E. m. krefftii  
E. m. nigra  
E. m. emmotti  
| synonyms =E. m. macquarii 
Emys macquaria 
Chelys (Hydraspis) macquarii
Hydraspis macquarrii 
Platemys macquaria 
Hydraspis australis 
Euchelymys sulcifera 
Emydura macquariae
Emydura signata 
Emydura canni 
Chelymys cooki 
Chelymys johncanni 
Emydura macquarii binjing
Emydura macquarii dharra
Emydura macquarii gunabarra
Emydura macquarii dharuk

E. m. emmotti 
Chelymys windorah 
Emydura macquarii emmotti 

E. m. krefftii 
Chelymys krefftii 
Chelymys victoriae marmorata
Chelymys victoriae sulcata

E. m. nigra 
Tropicochelymys insularis 
Emydura macquarii nigra 

| synonyms_ref = <ref name=ttwg>Turtle Taxonomy Working Group [ van Dijk PP, Iverson JB, Rhodin AGJ, Shaffer HB, Bour R ]. (2014). "Turtles of the World, 7th edition: annotated checklist of taxonomy, synonymy, distribution with maps, and conservation status". In: Rhodin AGJ, Pritchard PCH, van Dijk PP, Saumure RA, Buhlmann KA, Iverson JB, Mittermeier RA (Eds.). Conservation Biology of Freshwater Turtles and Tortoises: A Compilation Project of the IUCN/SSC Tortoise and Freshwater Turtle Specialist Group. Chelonian Research Monographs 5 (7): 000.329–479, doi:10.3854/ crm.5.000.checklist.v7.2014.</ref>
}}Emydura macquarii (common names include Murray River turtle, Macquarie River turtle, eastern short-necked turtle, eastern short-neck turtle and southern river turtle) is a species of turtle in the family Chelidae. It is a wide-ranging species that occurs throughout many of the rivers of the eastern half of Australia. It is found primarily in the Macquarie River basin and all its major tributaries, along with a number of coastal rivers up the New South Wales Coast. It is also found in the coastal Queensland rivers and the Cooper Creek ecosystem, along with Fraser Island.

It is often infected with the flatworm Choanocotyle elegans.

Collection history and discovery
This species has a long and complicated nomenclatural history, including even its original description. The holotype was originally collected by René Primevère Lesson (1794–1849) and Prosper Garnot (1794–1838) in 1824. During an expedition on the La Coquille, captained by Louis Isidore Duperrey, which visited Sydney, Australia, from 17 January - 25 March 1824, they visited Bathurst, and collected the holotype from the Macquarie River.

The first description of the species was offered by Baron Georges Cuvier in 1829, but this description is nowadays seen as a nomen nudum. Hence, the description by John Edward Gray in 1831 is considered the valid description.

Sex determination
E. macquarii uses the XY sex-determination system, making it one of the few turtle species that has a genetic sex-determination mechanism. The X and Y chromosomes are macrochromosomes, unlike most genetically sex-determined turtles including its close relative Chelodina longicollis, which has microchromosomes. It is also hypothesized that this turtle's sex chromosomes were formed from the translocation of an ancestral Y microchromosome onto an autosome. It can often be difficult to determine the gender of a turtle when it is young, but it will get more apparent when it grows.

Etymology
The generic name, Emydura, is derived from the Greek emys (freshwater turtle) and the Greek oura (tail), Latinized to ura. Its grammatical gender is feminine. The specific epithet, macquarii, refers to the turtle's type locality: the Macquarie River. It would seem that the species was not named after Governor Lachlan Macquarie for whom the river is named.

The subspecific name, emmotti, is in honor of Australian farmer and naturalist Angus Emmott (born 1962).

The subspecific name, krefftii, is in honor of German-born Australian naturalist Gerard Krefft.

Conservation status
Emydura macquarii is listed as 'vulnerable' in the state of South Australia under relevant state legislation.

Gallery

References

macquarii
Murray River
Reptiles of Queensland
Reptiles described in 1830
Taxa named by John Edward Gray
Reptiles of New South Wales
Reptiles of Victoria (Australia)
Turtles of Australia